The East Germany national badminton team represented East Germany in international badminton team competitions. After the German reunification on October 1990, the East German badminton team merged with the national badminton of West Germany and the Deutscher Federball-Verband (also known as DDR-Badmintonverband) was merged with the German Badminton Association.

East Germany competed in the Helvetia Cup mixed team tournament once in 1977 and achieved third place. East Germany also won a bronze at the European Junior Badminton Championships in the women's singles event.

Participation in European Team Badminton Championships 
Mixed Team

Participation in Helvetia Cup 
The Helvetia Cup or European B Team Championships was a European mixed team championship in badminton. The first Helvetia Cup tournament took place in Zurich, Switzerland in 1962. The tournament took place every two years from 1971 until 2007, after which it was dissolved.

Squad 
Before the dissolution of East Germany, the following players were selected to represent the country in international tournaments.

Male players
Thomas Mundt
André Wiechmann
Kai Abraham
Erfried Michalowsky
Edgar Michalowski

Female players
Monika Cassens
Petra Michalowsky
Birgit Kämmer
Angela Michalowski
Ilona Michalowsky

References 

Badminton
National badminton teams